Daniel Gregorio Rodríguez Lima (born 22 December 1965), known as Coquito, is a Uruguayan retired footballer who played as a forward.

Club career
Having started his career in his native Uruguay with Peñarol, where he made his debut at the age of 14, Coquito embarked on a career which took him to Argentina, Austria and Spain.

Personal life
Coquito is the father of Real Madrid Castilla player Álvaro Rodríguez. He is also the nephew of former Uruguay international footballer Climaco Rodríguez.

Honours 
Peñarol
 Intercontinental Cup: 1982
 Copa Libertadores: 1982, 1987
 Uruguayan Primera División: 1981, 1982, 1985, 1986
 IFA Shield: 1985
Mandiyú
 Primera B Nacional: 1987–88

References

Living people
1965 births
Footballers from Montevideo
Association football forwards
Uruguayan footballers
Uruguay youth international footballers
Uruguay international footballers
Argentine Primera División players
Primera Nacional players
Austrian Football Bundesliga players
Segunda División players
Peñarol players
Deportivo Mandiyú footballers
SK Rapid Wien players
Palamós CF footballers
Atlético Tucumán footballers
Chaco For Ever footballers
Deportivo Morón footballers
Uruguayan expatriate footballers
Uruguayan expatriate sportspeople in Argentina
Expatriate footballers in Argentina
Uruguayan expatriate sportspeople in Austria
Expatriate footballers in Austria
Uruguayan expatriate sportspeople in Spain
Expatriate footballers in Spain